The 1961–62 season was the 78th football season in which Dumbarton competed at a Scottish national level, entering the Scottish Football League, the Scottish Cup and the Scottish League Cup.  In addition Dumbarton competed in the Stirlingshire Cup.

Scottish Second Division

Following six seasons of top half finishes in the league, season 1961–62 was to prove disastrous, with Dumbarton slumping to finish in 17th place with 28 points, 26 behind champions Clyde.

Scottish League Cup

The League Cup sectional ties produced only one win from six games, resulting in no further interest in the competition.

Scottish Cup

Dumbarton embarrassingly lost out in the second round of the Cup to Highland League opponents Ross County, having received a first round bye.

Stirlingshire Cup
Dumbarton lost out to East Stirling in the semi final of the county cup.

Friendly

Player statistics

Squad 

|}

Source:

International Caps
John Neeson earned his first and second caps playing for Scotland Amateurs against Wales on 3 March and England on 16 March respectively.

Transfers
Amongst those players joining and leaving the club were the following:

Players in

Players out 

Source:

Reserve team
Dumbarton played a team in the Combined Reserve League, but results were poor – finishing 7th and last in the first series with 1 win and 1 draw from 12 matches – and 5th in the second series with 3 wins and 3 draws from 12.  In the Scottish Second XI Cup, Dumbarton lost in the first round to Celtic.

References

Dumbarton F.C. seasons
Scottish football clubs 1961–62 season